Big Night is a 1996 American comedy-drama film co-directed by Campbell Scott and Stanley Tucci. The film stars Tucci, alongside Minnie Driver, Ian Holm, Isabella Rossellini, Allison Janney and Tony Shalhoub.

Produced by David Kirkpatrick and Jonathan Filley for the Samuel Goldwyn Company, the film was met with largely positive reviews and grossed $14 million worldwide. It was nominated for the "Grand Jury Prize" at the Sundance Film Festival and the "Grand Special Prize" at the Deauville Film Festival. Scott and Tucci won the New York Film Critics Circle Award and the Boston Society of Film Critics Award for Best New Director. Tucci and Joseph Tropiano won the Independent Spirit Award for Best First Screenplay.

Plot
On the Jersey Shore in the 1950s, two Italian immigrant brothers from Calabria own and operate a restaurant called "Paradise". One brother, Primo, is a brilliant, perfectionist chef who chafes under their few customers' expectations of "Americanized" Italian food. Their uncle's offer for them to return to Rome to help with his restaurant is growing in appeal to Primo. 

The younger brother, Secondo, is the restaurant manager, a man enamoured of the possibilities presented by their new endeavor and life in America. Despite Secondo's efforts and Primo's magnificent food, their restaurant is failing to gain success and recognition.

Secondo's struggles as a businessman render him unable to commit to his girlfriend Phyllis, and he has recently been sleeping with Gabriella, the wife of a competitor. Her husband's eponymous restaurant, "Pascal's", has succeeded despite (or perhaps due to) the mediocre, uninspired food served there. 

Desperate to keep Paradise afloat, Secondo asks Pascal for a loan. Pascal demurs, repeating a past offer for the brothers to work for him, which Secondo refuses: he and his brother want their own restaurant.  In a seemingly generous gesture, Pascal insists that he will persuade popular Italian-American singer Louis Prima to dine at Paradise when in town, assuming the celebrity jazz singer's patronage will revitalize the brothers' business. 

Primo and Secondo dive into the preparations for this "big night", spending their entire savings on  food, drinks and decoration, inviting numerous people (including a newspaper reporter and Primo's love interest) to join them for a magnificent feast showcasing a timpano (a complex baked pasta dish). Primo pours his heart into every dish, lavishing care and great expertise on the cooking.

As they wait for Prima and his entourage to arrive, the dinner party indulges in the exquisite food and partakes in a fabulous celebration. Hours go by, however, and it becomes apparent that the famous singer is not coming, although a reporter who came to cover the singer's appearance promises to ask his newspaper to send a food critic. Phyllis catches Secondo and Gabriella kissing and runs off to the beach. At Gabriella's insistence, Pascal admits that he never called Louis Prima, thus ending the party.

Secondo follows Phyllis to the beach where they have a final quarrel.  Primo and Secondo have a fiery, heart-wrenching argument, chafing at their mutual differences. In the wee hours of the morning, Pascal admits to Secondo that he set the brothers up for failure; not as revenge for Secondo's affair with Gabriella but because the brothers would have no choice but to return to Italy or work for Pascal.  Secondo refuses him, saying they will never work for him.

As dawn breaks, Secondo silently cooks an omelette. When done, he divides it in thirds, giving one to Cristiano,   one for himself, and leaving the remainder in the pan. Primo hesitantly enters, and Secondo serves him the last portion. Cristiano leaves, as the brothers begin to eat. They lay their arms across one another's shoulders, and eat silently.

Cast

Stanley Tucci as Secondo
Tony Shalhoub as Primo
Minnie Driver as Phyllis
Ian Holm as Pascal
Isabella Rossellini as Gabriella
Allison Janney as Ann Travis  
Marc Anthony as Cristiano
Caroline Aaron as Woman in restaurant 
Campbell Scott as Bob
Susan Floyd as Joan
Pasquale Cajano as Alberto N. Pisani
Robert W. Castle as Father O'Brien
Andre Belgrader as Stash
Gene Canfield as Charlie
Liev Schreiber as Leo

Reception
On review aggregator Rotten Tomatoes, the film has an approval rating of 96% based on 56 reviews, with an average rating of 8.1/10. The website's critical consensus reads, "The performances in Big Night are wonderful, and the food looks delicious." On Metacritic, the film has a weighted average score of 80 out of 100, based on 23 critics, indicating "generally favorable reviews".

Awards and nominations

References

External links

 
"Heaven and Hell in Big Night"

1996 comedy-drama films
1996 films
American comedy-drama films
Cooking films
Films about Italian-American culture
Films directed by Stanley Tucci
Films set in New Jersey
Films set in restaurants
Films set in the 1950s
Sundance Film Festival award winners
1996 independent films
The Samuel Goldwyn Company films
1996 directorial debut films
Films about brothers
Italian-language American films
1990s English-language films
1990s American films
1990s Italian-language films
1996 multilingual films
American multilingual films